Lascelina canens is a species of snout moth in the genus Lascelina. It was described by Carl Heinrich in 1956. It is found in the US state of Texas.

References

Moths described in 1956
Phycitinae